Major General Heinrich Christoph Karl Herrmann, Reichsgraf von Wylich und Lottum (8 January 1773 in Cleves – night of 7/8 February 1830, in Berlin) was a Prussian officer who fought in the Napoleonic Wars including the Waterloo Campaign in 1815.

Notes

References

Further reading
 
 Kurt von Priesdorff: Soldatisches Führertum. Band 4, Hanseatische Verlagsanstalt Hamburg, ohne Jahr, p. 230–231.
 Leopold von Zedlitz-Neukirch: Neues preussisches Adels-Lexicon. Band 3, p. 308.

1773 births
1830 deaths
Prussian commanders of the Napoleonic Wars
Lieutenant generals of Prussia
People from Kleve
Military personnel from North Rhine-Westphalia